Retrogradation is the landward change in position of the front of a river delta with time. This occurs when the mass balance of sediment into the delta is such that the volume of incoming sediment is less than the volume of the delta that is lost through subsidence, sea-level rise, and/or erosion. As a result, retrogradation is most common:
during periods of sea-level rise which results in marine transgression. This can occur during major periods of global warming and the melting of continental ice sheets.
with extremely low sediment input.

See also

References
Schlumberger Oilfield Glossary

Sedimentology
Stratigraphy